Coonawarra may refer to:

 Coonawarra wine region, a wine region in South Australia.
 Coonawarra, South Australia, the town at the centre of the wine region.
 Coonawarra, Northern Territory, an outer suburb of Darwin, Australia.
 HMAS Coonawarra, a naval base in Darwin, Australia.